The 17th Louisiana Infantry Regiment was a unit of volunteers recruited in Louisiana that fought in the Confederate States Army during the American Civil War. The regiment formed at Camp Moore in September 1861 and served during the war in the Western Theater of the American Civil War. The unit stayed in New Orleans until February 1862 and then moved north. In 1862, the regiment fought at Shiloh and Chickasaw Bayou. In 1863, it fought in the Vicksburg campaign at Port Gibson and in the Siege of Vicksburg, where it was captured. The soldiers were paroled and went home. The regiment reported to a parole camp at Shreveport, Louisiana, in January 1864. The regiment was on garrison duty in western Louisiana for the remainder of the war, before disbanding in May 1865.

See also
List of Louisiana Confederate Civil War units
Louisiana in the Civil War

Notes

References

 

Units and formations of the Confederate States Army from Louisiana
1861 establishments in Louisiana
Military units and formations established in 1861
1865 disestablishments in Louisiana
Military units and formations disestablished in 1865